Opsaridium leleupi is a species of ray-finned fish in the family Cyprinidae. It is found in the upper Lualaba River in Democratic Republic of the Congo.

References

Opsaridium
Fish described in 1965
Taxa named by Hubert Matthes
Fish of the Democratic Republic of the Congo
Endemic fauna of the Democratic Republic of the Congo